The flag of Norfolk is the flag of the English county of Norfolk. The flag consist of a vertical bi-colour of gold and black, with a white bend bearing nine black ermine spots alternating between pairs and singles. It was officially registered on 11 September 2014 as a traditional county flag, following a campaign by Norfolk resident Dominic Victor Maverick Smith.



Design and symbolism 
The flag's design is the banner of arms attributed to the first Earl of Norfolk, Ralph de Gael. This 12th-century design has been associated with the county ever since, appearing on maps and books and of course forming the basis of the county council arms awarded in 1904. It is thought that the ermine bend (the diagonal stripe from top left to bottom right) found in the design may be a reference to Brittany, where Ralph was Lord of Gael as the ermine is a common local emblem such that it features on the Breton flag. This ermine pattern has had differing designs but for the registration a precise form was chosen in consultation with the Flag Institute and a flag bearing this design was commissioned by the Association of British Counties. This pattern was duly registered.

Council Flag

Before the creation of a Norfolk flag, the Norfolk County Council’s coat of arms had been constructed as a flag so was incorrectly described as the county flag of Norfolk. Whilst also incorporating the De Gael design the council arms represent the council only, and include a specific ornamentation from King Edward VII in recognition of the royal residence at Sandringham – a red bar, heraldically termed a “chief”, placed across the De Gael arms and featuring elements borne by the Prince of Wales, a title which the king had previously held. This very specific design, accordingly, very clearly represents only the council rather than the county as an entity in its own right.

References

Norfolk
Norfolk
Norfolk